Pedro Júlio Marques Ribeiro (born 8 February 1979 in Aveiro) is a Portuguese retired footballer who played as a right back.

External links

1979 births
Living people
People from Aveiro, Portugal
Portuguese footballers
Association football defenders
Primeira Liga players
Liga Portugal 2 players
Segunda Divisão players
S.C. Beira-Mar players
Rio Ave F.C. players
Boavista F.C. players
Portugal youth international footballers
Sportspeople from Aveiro District